Slowly Rolling Camera is a jazz band formed in Cardiff in 2013.

History
Slowly Rolling Camera was formed in Cardiff in 2013 by Dave Stapleton, also founder of Edition Records, as a composer and keyboardist, Elliot Bennett as percussionist, Deri Roberts as producer, and Dionne Bennett as vocalist and lyricist. With this formation they released 2 albums (Slowly Rolling Camera in 2014 and All Things in 2016) and an EP (Into the Shadow in 2014). 

Following the third album, Dionne Bennett left the group and the remaining three members in 2018 released an instrumental album: Juniper.

Music style
The music style of Slowly Rolling Camera is a combination of jazz and trip-hop, with influences from The Cinematic Orchestra, Bonobo and Portishead, receiving good reviews since the release of their first album, produced by Andy Allan (producer also of Portishead and Massive Attack).

Discography

Studio albums 
2014: Slowly Rolling Camera
2016: All Things
2018: Juniper
2021: Where the Streets Lead

Extended play
2014: Into the Shadow

References

External links 
 
 
 
 
 

British jazz ensembles
Edition Records artists
Music in Cardiff